Ganeshman Charanath (Nepali: गणेशमान चारनाथ ) is a municipality in Dhanusha District in Madhesh province of Nepal. It was formed in 2016 occupying current 11 sections (wards) from previous 11 VDCs. It occupies an area of 244.31 km2 with a total population of 37,300.

References 

Municipalities in Madhesh Province
Nepal municipalities established in 2017